Laser Broadcasting was a commercial radio operator based in Darlington in County Durham, England, which was active between 2002 and 2008.

History

The group was founded in 2002 by Nigel Reeve—one of the launch directors of Classic FM and one-time chief executive of London News Radio, owners of LBC—and Nick Jordan, a media sales executive who previously worked at Invicta Radio, KMFM and the Daily Express. Jordan left the company in August 2004.

Laser Broadcasting, via subsidiaries, held the licences for nine commercial local radio stations in the UK:
Bath FM, in Bath, Somerset
Brunel FM, in Swindon, Wiltshire
Sunshine 855, in Ludlow, Shropshire
Sunshine 1530, in Worcester
Sunshine 106.2, in Hereford
Quay West 107.4, in Bridgwater, Somerset
Quay West 102.4/100.8 in Watchet, Somerset
3TR FM, in Warminster, Wiltshire
Fresh Radio, in Skipton, North Yorkshire

After administration, Begbies Traynor sold five of Laser's stations to farmer and property developer John Roberts, who was also the owner of Exeter-based South West Radio Ltd. He bought Bath FM, Brunel FM, 3TR, and the two QuayWest stations.

References

External links
Bath FM.net All fact, no fiction: A potted history of Bath FM
Quay West Radio set to fold
Wiltshire radio station's owner goes into administration

Radio broadcasting companies of the United Kingdom
Companies based in County Durham
Mass media companies established in 2002
Mass media companies disestablished in 2009
2002 establishments in England